"L'Oiseau électrique" is a song by French virtual singer Pinocchio from his second album Magic Pinocchio. It was the album's fourth track and it was released as its second and last single. The single came out in August 2007, five months and a half after the album, and debuted at number 38 in France.

Track listing

Charts

References 

2007 songs
2007 singles
Pinocchio (singer) songs
EMI Music France singles